Josh Kelly (born April 25, 1982) is an American actor, known for his portrayal of Cutter Wentworth on the ABC soap opera One Life to Live. He has also appeared in Transformers: Revenge of the Fallen and Transformers: Dark of the Moon. Kelly also starred as Jeremy Caner in the television series UnREAL, which premiered its first season in June 2015 on Lifetime.

Early life 
Kelly was born in Yokosuka, Japan, and raised in Columbia, Maryland, where he graduated from Atholton High School in 2000. He attended high School with Dewanda Wise He knew at a young age that he wanted to be an actor and did not want to attend college.

Military service 
Kelly was always interested in acting in action movies. He said he was prompted to join the military because, "I wanted to know if I could do it myself". Due to the influence of his Navy Commander father and the fact that he was a strong swimmer, he initially considered becoming a United States Navy SEAL. Due to his liking of being in the woods, Kelly chose to join the United States Army. He served three tours in Afghanistan and one tour in Iraq as an Army Ranger. Kelly injured his leg during his service. After leaving the Army, he moved to Los Angeles to pursue his acting career.

Acting career 
Kelly has appeared in minor guest-starring roles in various films and television shows, including Ugly Betty and Las Vegas in 2007, True Blood (2008), NCIS: Los Angeles (2010), Transformers: Revenge of the Fallen (2009), and its sequel, Transformers: Dark of the Moon (2011). He joined the cast of One Life to Live as Cutter Wentworth in December 2010, and remained on the show until December 2011. Following the cancellation of One Life to Live, Kelly was among the actors who signed on to perform in a planned continuation web series that was never realized. In January 2013, it was announced that Kelly had signed on again for Prospect Park's second attempt to reboot the soap opera as a web series. He reprised the role of Cutter for the series on The Online Network from April 29 to August 19, 2013. In September 2013, Josh was cast in the Lifetime drama series UnREAL.

In May 2022, Deadline Hollywood reported that Kelly had joined the cast of General Hospital in the role of Cody Bell.

Filmography

References

External links
 

1982 births
21st-century American male actors
American male film actors
American male soap opera actors
United States Army personnel of the War in Afghanistan (2001–2021)
United States Army personnel of the Iraq War
Living people
People from Yokosuka, Kanagawa
Atholton High School alumni
People from Columbia, Maryland
Male actors from Los Angeles
Male actors from Maryland
United States Army Rangers